Richard Ithamar Aaron,  (6 November 1901 – 29 March 1987), was a Welsh philosopher who became an authority on the work of John Locke. He also wrote a history of philosophy in the Welsh language.

Early life and education
Born in Blaendulais, Glamorgan, Aaron was the son of a Welsh Baptist draper, William Aaron, and his wife, Margaret Griffith. He was educated at Ystalyfera Grammar School, then at the University of Wales from 1918, where he studied history and philosophy. In 1923 he was elected a Fellow of the university, allowing him to attend Oriel College, Oxford, where he gained a DPhil in 1928 for a dissertation on "The History and Value of the Distinction between Intellect and Intuition".

Career
In 1926 Aaron was appointed a lecturer in the Department of Philosophy at Swansea University. After the retirement of W. Jenkin Jones in 1932, Aaron was appointed to the chair of philosophy at Aberystwyth University where he settled, initially on the nearby hill of Bryn Hir and later at Garth Celyn.

Although his early publications focused on epistemology and the history of ideas, Aaron became fascinated with the work and life of John Locke. The interest was sparked by his discovery of unexamined information in the Lovelace Collection: notes and drafts left by John Locke to his cousin Peter King. There he found letters, notebooks, catalogues, and most pertinently, an early draft of Locke's "An Essay Concerning Human Understanding", hitherto presumed missing. Aaron's research led to the 1937 publication of a book on the life and work of Locke that subsequently became an accepted standard work. The proofs were read by Rhiannon Morgan, whom Aaron married in 1937. They had five children. 
 
Aaron produced several more books and articles, including a book in Welsh on the history of philosophy, Hanes athroniaeth—o Descartes i Hegel in 1932. His attempts to boost interest in philosophy in Wales included establishing in that year a philosophy section at the University of Wales Guild of Graduates, which still conducts its proceedings in Welsh.

Other notable publications of Aaron's include an essay, "Two Senses of the Word Universal", in Mind in 1939, and "Our Knowledge of Universals", a study read to the British Academy in 1945 and published in volume 23 of its Proceedings. Aaron's work shows a fascination with the idea of a universal, which culminated in a 1952 book The Theory of Universals. Here, he attacks the notion of universals as Platonic forms, but is as critical of Aristotelian realism on essences as he is of nominalism and conceptualism as theories of universals.

In 1952–1953, Aaron was a Visiting Professor at Yale University. In 1956, he was able to study the third draft of Locke's An Essay Concerning Human Understanding at the Pierpont Morgan Library, which led to a substantial addition to the second edition of John Locke, published in 1955. He became a Fellow of the British Academy (FBA) and president of the Mind Association in the same year. In 1956, an annual lecture hosted by the Aristotelian Society and the Mind Association (publisher of the journal Mind) was instituted in Aberystwyth, and Aaron invited to give the inaugural lecture. In 1957 he was elected President of the Aristotelian Society.

In 1967, Aaron published a second edition of The Theory of Universals with a new preface and several additions and rewritten chapters. In 1971, he published a third edition of his Locke biography and the book Knowing and the Function of Reason, which includes broad discussion of the laws of non-contradiction, excluded middle and identity, of the use of language in speech and thought, and of substance and causality.

After retiring in 1969, he taught for a semester at Carlton College, Minnesota, before returning to Wales, where he helped to write articles for the 1974 edition of the Encyclopædia Britannica. He began to feel the effects of Alzheimer's disease and died at his home on 29 March 1987.

Richard Aaron was the father of the academic and Welsh literature specialist Jane Aaron, born in 1951.

Selected works

See also

John Locke

References

Further reading

1901 births
1987 deaths
20th-century British educators
20th-century British non-fiction writers
20th-century British philosophers
20th-century essayists
20th-century Welsh educators
20th-century Welsh writers
Academics of Aberystwyth University
Academics of Swansea University
Alumni of Oriel College, Oxford
Aristotelian philosophers
British logicians
British male essayists
Carleton College faculty
Deaths from Alzheimer's disease
Deaths from dementia in Wales
Epistemologists
Fellows of the British Academy
Historians of philosophy
John Locke
Lecturers
Metaphysicians
Ontologists
Philosophers of education
Philosophers of history
Philosophers of language
Philosophers of literature
Philosophers of logic
Philosophers of mind
Philosophy academics
Philosophy writers
Presidents of the Aristotelian Society
Welsh essayists
Welsh philosophers
Welsh scholars and academics
Yale University faculty